Reset (3 November 2000 – 4 May 2021) was an Australian-bred Thoroughbred racehorse and sire by the leading sire in Australia and New Zealand, Zabeel out of the multiple Group One winner Assertive Lass.

Racing career
He raced only as a three-year-old, in the 2003–2004 season, and recorded five wins from as many starts, including the Cadbury Guineas and the Futurity Stakes - both at Group One level.  In the Guineas, he narrowly defeated Starcraft, who went on to win two Group One races in Europe. Rather than continuing his career, Reset was sold at four years of age to Darley Stud, Australia.

After 15 years as a stallion, Reset was retired by Darley in 2019, having sired 34 stakes winners and his progeny earning $55 million in prizemoney.

Reset died on the 4 May 2021 aged 20 years.

Stud career

Reset sired five individual Group 1 winners:

c = colt, f = filly, g = gelding

See also
 List of leading Thoroughbred racehorses

References

 Reset's racing record

External links 
Reset at Darley Stud

2000 racehorse births
2021 racehorse deaths
Racehorses bred in Australia
Racehorses trained in Australia
Undefeated racehorses
Thoroughbred family 4-o